The 2016–17 SV Darmstadt 98 season is the 119th season in the football club's history and 2nd consecutive and 4th overall season in the top flight of German football, the Bundesliga, having been promoted from the 2. Bundesliga in 2015. Darmstadt 98 will also participate in this season's edition of the domestic cup, the DFB-Pokal. It is the 96th season for Darmstadt in the Jonathan-Heimes-Stadion am Böllenfalltor, located in Darmstadt, Germany. The season covers a period from 1 July 2016 to 30 June 2017.

Players

Squad

Competitions

Overview

Bundesliga

League table

Results summary

Results by round

Matches

DFB-Pokal

Statistics

Appearances and goals

|-
! colspan=14 style=background:#dcdcdc; text-align:center| Goalkeepers

|-
! colspan=14 style=background:#dcdcdc; text-align:center| Defenders

|-
! colspan=14 style=background:#dcdcdc; text-align:center| Midfielders

|-
! colspan=14 style=background:#dcdcdc; text-align:center| Forwards

|-
! colspan=14 style=background:#dcdcdc; text-align:center| Players transferred out during the season

Goalscorers

Last updated: 20 May 2017

Clean sheets

Last updated: 29 April 2017

Disciplinary record

Last updated: 13 May 2017

References

SV Darmstadt 98 seasons
Darmstadt 98